Landensberg is a municipality in the district of Günzburg in Bavaria, Germany.

References

Populated places in Günzburg (district)